The Orlando Apollos were a professional American football franchise based in Orlando, Florida, and one of the eight members of the Alliance of American Football (AAF), which began play in February 2019. The team played its home games at Spectrum Stadium on the campus of the University of Central Florida. They were coached by Heisman Trophy winner and former college and National Football League (NFL) head coach Steve Spurrier. NFL front office veteran Tim Ruskell was the general manager and longtime college athletics executive Michael P. Waddell was the team president.

The team's name was inspired by the Greek god Apollo, and his and Florida's connections to the Sun, while the team's colors of orange and navy were tributes to Florida's sunshine and the Apollo program, respectively. The team's helmets depicted Apollo, who is commonly pictured as an archer, shooting a bow-and-arrow.

On April 2, 2019, the league's football operations were reportedly suspended, and on April 4 the league allowed players to leave their contracts to sign with NFL teams. The league filed for Chapter 7 bankruptcy on April 17, 2019.

History
On April 7, 2018, Orlando was announced as the first Alliance team along with its coach, Steve Spurrier. On September 20, the league announced four inaugural eastern franchises' names and logos including the Orlando Apollos. On December 4, 2018, the team and iHeart Media announced its broadcasting arrangements.

The final 52-man roster was set on January 30, 2019. The team's first game was at home, Spectrum Stadium, against the Atlanta Legends on February 9, 2019, where they won 40–6.

On February 20, 2019, the league announced that due to Florida worker's compensation laws, the Apollos had moved its practices to Camden County High School in Kingsland, Georgia, with players being housed at hotels in Jacksonville, Florida, and commuting to home games in Orlando. The AAF was unable to secure a league-wide insurance plan prior to the start of the season, and while the state of Georgia will arrange worker's compensation insurance for any business, including professional sports where the majority of practices are held in the state, Florida does not classify professional athletes as employees.

The Apollos began play on February 9, winning their first game in blowout fashion, defeating the Atlanta Legends at Spectrum Stadium, 40–6. They would follow the opening win up with another high-scoring effort on the road, defeating the San Antonio Commanders, 37–29. They would win their first five games, and were the AAF's last undefeated team in the inaugural season before losing to the Arizona Hotshots on March 16, 22–17. However, they bounced back the next week by beating the Atlanta Legends, 36–6, to become the first team in the inaugural season to qualify for the playoffs.

After the league's suspension of football operations, head coach Spurrier, by virtue of the team's league-leading record, stated, "we’ve got to be the champs, right?" FanDuel Sportsbook declared the Apollos "honorary champions", while paying out futures bets placed on all AAF teams.

Final Roster

Allocation pool 
The team's assigned area, which designates player rights, includes the following:

Colleges
 Bethune-Cookman
 Florida
 Florida A&M
 Florida Atlantic
 Florida International
 Florida State

 Florida Tech
 Jacksonville
 Miami (FL)
 Stetson
 South Florida
 UCF
 West Florida

National Football League (NFL)
 Miami Dolphins
 New York Giants
 New York Jets
 Tampa Bay Buccaneers

Canadian Football League (CFL)
 Hamilton Tiger-Cats

Staff

Notable Former Players 

 D'Ernest Johnson - Current Cleveland Browns Running Back

2019 season

Final standings

Schedule

Preseason

Regular season
All times Eastern

 Changed from original time and/or network.

Source:

Postseason

Game summaries

Week 1: Atlanta

In a light rain, the Orlando Apollos hosted the Atlanta Legends in the first week of the Alliance of American Football. Quarterback Garrett Gilbert threw for 227 yards and two touchdown passes, and caught a touchdown pass. The Apollos dominated the game on both offense and defense. The Orlando defense compiled three sacks, and three interceptions. Terence Garvin had two of the interceptions, the second was returned 51 yards for a touchdown.

Week 2: at San Antonio

With the score tied 29–29 midway through the fourth quarter, Apollos linebacker Keith Reaser intercepted Commanders quarterback Logan Woodside. Reaser returned the ball 39 yards for the game-winning touchdown. Orlando beat San Antonio by the score of 37–29 to improve to 2–0 on the season.

Week 3: Memphis

A defensive battle in the first half, Orlando led Memphis 9-0 at halftime. The Apollos stretched their lead to 15–6 after a 37-yard touchdown pass from Garrett Gilbert to Rannell Hall on a 4th down & 8. Gilbert later ran for a 21-yard touchdown off a run-pass option play to go up 21–9. Though Memphis cut the lead to 21–17, Orlando put the game away with a clock-burning drive all the way to the Memphis 1 yard line. Gilbert took a knee to end the game, and Orlando improved to 3–0.

Week 4: at Salt Lake

On a snowy night in Salt Lake City, Orlando beat the Stallions 20–11 to remain unbeaten. After taking a 6–3 lead at halftime, the Apollos scored two touchdowns in the second half to secure the victory. In the third quarter, quarterback Garrett Gilbert threw a 20-yard touchdown to Donteeya Dye Jr. followed by a 2-point conversion pass from running back D’Ernest Johnson to Sean Price. In the fourth quarter, running back Akeem Hunt scored a 2-yard touchdown run.

Week 5: at Birmingham

Going into the game, Orlando had the best offense in the league, while Birmingham had the best defense. The Apollos, however, beat the Iron handily to improve to 5–0. Orlando put up 468 yards of offense, sacked Birmingham five times, and Keith Reaser made an interception return for a touchdown, his second of the season.

Week 6: Arizona

Orlando suffered their first loss of the season against the Arizona Hotshots. Trailing 22–17 with 55 second remaining, the Apollos fielded a punt, and took over at their own 18 yard line. With no timeouts left, Garrett Gilbert threw a 48-yard pass to a wide open Sean Price. At the Hotshots 34 yard line, Gilbert spiked the ball to stop the clock. He then threw a 26-yard completion to Jalin Marshall to the 8 yard line with less than 10 seconds left in regulation. But as the team was scrambling to line up and spike the ball, the Apollos were penalized for a false start. A ten-second runoff was administered, and the game clock expired.

Week 7: at Atlanta

Garrett Gilbert threw for 217 yards and one touchdown pass as Orlando routed Atlanta by the score of 36–6. With the win, the Apollos improved to 6–1 and became the first team to clinch a playoff berth.

Week 8: at Memphis

Trailing 31–22 with 5 minutes remaining in regulation, Orlando rallied to beat Memphis by the score of 34–31. Garrett Gilbert threw an 18-yard touchdown to Charles Johnson with 4:49 left to trim the score to 31–28. On the ensuing drive, Memphis fumbled away the snap on a punt, giving Orlando the ball inside the 30 yard line. A few plays later, controversy erupted when Express coach Mike Singletary ran out on the field protesting what appeared to be a delay of game that was not called against the Apollos. Singletary received an unsportsmanlike conduct penalty, and the Apollos punched the ball in with a 1 yard touchdown run by De'Veon Smith for the game-winning score. Johnny Manziel started at quarterback for the Express, but left the game in the first quarter after a head injury.

Media
Apollos' games were broadcast on iHeartRadio's Real Radio 104.1 FM with the Apollos' weekly radio show heard Thursdays on WYGM and WJRR HD-2 channel, while a weekday program was heard on a group of thirteen area radio stations. The Apollos also had a weekly TV show every Wednesday night at 11 p.m. on Cox's TV 27. The program, APOLLOS FOOTBALL with Steve Spurrier, allowed fans to get a deeper look at the team, with player features,  behind-the-scenes access, and detailed analysis following each game.

References

Further reading
 

 
2018 establishments in Florida
2019 disestablishments in Florida